Fredric Pettersson (born 11 February 1989) is a Swedish handball player for Fenix Toulouse.

He participated at the 2017 World Men's Handball Championship.

References

External links

1989 births
Living people
Sportspeople from Jönköping
Swedish male handball players
Expatriate handball players
IFK Kristianstad players
Montpellier Handball players
Swedish expatriate sportspeople in Denmark
Swedish expatriate sportspeople in France
Hammarby IF Handboll players
Handball players at the 2020 Summer Olympics
Olympic handball players of Sweden
21st-century Swedish people